Srinivasa Perumal Temple is a Perumal Temple situated in Purasawalkam neighbourhood of Chennai district in Tamil Nadu state in the peninsular India.

This temple is under the control of Hindu Religious and Charitable Endowments Department, Government of Tamil Nadu. Kumbabhishek of this temple was performed on 15 September 2017. In April 2019, Lakhsarchana was done in the temple. This temple is one of the heritage buildings, as per the draft list prepared by the CMDA (Chennai Metropolitan Development Authority). Brahmotsav and Vaikunta Ekadasi are some of the important festivals celebrated in this temple.

References

External links 
 Geohack

Hindu temples in Chennai